 

Hofsjökull (Icelandic: "temple glacier") is the third largest ice cap in Iceland after Vatnajökull and Langjökull and the largest active volcano in the country. It is situated in the west of the Highlands of Iceland and north of the mountain range Kerlingarfjöll, between the two largest glaciers of Iceland. It covers an area of 925 km2, reaching  at its summit. The subglacial volcano is a shield type with caldera.

Hofsjökull is the source of several rivers including the Þjórsá, Iceland's longest river.

In the southeast of Iceland, between the easternmost glacier tongue of Vatnajökull (Axajökull) and Þrándarjökull, there is a smaller glacier (area about 4 km2), which is also called Hofsjökull.

In 2015, Hofsjökull increased in mass, the first time in 20 years this had happened.

See also
 Glaciers of Iceland
 Iceland plume
 List of volcanoes in Iceland

Notes

References

External links

 Hofsjökull in the Catalogue of Icelandic Volcanoes
 (Photo)
 

Highlands of Iceland
Shield volcanoes of Iceland
Mid-Iceland Belt
Subglacial volcanoes of Iceland
Glaciers of Iceland
Volcanic systems of Iceland
Calderas of Iceland